Nathan Bartholomew Morris (born June 18, 1971) is an American baritenor, singer, businessman, and the founding member of American band Boyz II Men. He was the host of the show Hit Properties on the DIY Network where he bought and renovated a multi-million dollar home.

References

Further reading
 Nathan Morris in-depth interview by Pete Lewis, 'Blues & Soul' March 2008

External links
 Official [ Nathan Morris] at Allmusic

American contemporary R&B singers
American soul musicians
American baritones
American tenors
21st-century American businesspeople
Boyz II Men members
Living people
Musicians from Philadelphia
1971 births
Singers from Pennsylvania
20th-century African-American male singers
Grammy Award winners
21st-century African-American male singers